LeBlanc is an unincorporated community in Iberville Parish, Louisiana, United States.

References

Unincorporated communities in Iberville Parish, Louisiana
Unincorporated communities in Louisiana